Harry Leask (born 16 October 1995) is a British rower.

Rowing career
In 2021, he won a European bronze medal in the double sculls in Glasgow.

He has been selected for the British team to compete in the rowing events, in the quadruple sculls for the 2020 Summer Olympics.

References

External links

1995 births
Living people
British male rowers
Olympic rowers of Great Britain
Rowers at the 2020 Summer Olympics
Medalists at the 2020 Summer Olympics
Olympic silver medallists for Great Britain
Olympic medalists in rowing
Scottish Olympic medallists
World Rowing Championships medalists for Great Britain